Roger Williams (born 1974) is a Welsh playwright and screenwriter working in both English and Welsh.  His work often examines aspects of modern Welsh life, such as the place of minority languages, the plight of declining industrial communities and the Cardiff gay scene.

He was born at Newport, Wales, and brought up in Carmarthen.  He graduated in 1995 from the University of Warwick with a degree in English and American Literature.

His theatre work includes:
 Surfing, Carmarthen Bay (1995)
 Love in Aberdare (1997)
 Gulp (1997)
 Calon Lân (1997)
 Saturday Night Forever (1998)
 Killing Kangaroos (1999)
 Pop (2000)
 Y Byd (A'i Brawd) (2004)
 Me, a Giant (2005)
 Mother Tongue (2005)
 "Kapow!" (2006)
 "Tir Sir Gâr" (2013)

In 2002, his work Tales from the Pleasure Beach, screened on BBC Two, was nominated for a BAFTA Award in the Best Drama Series category.  He has also written episodes of "Hollyoaks" (Channel 4), "The Story of Tracy Beaker" (BBC), "The Bench" (BBC Wales), "Citizens!" (BBC Wales) and many episodes of the daily Welsh-language soap opera Pobol y Cwm which is broadcast on S4C.  In 2006, he became the lead writer of S4C's popular new drama series "Caerdydd", for which he won a Bafta in 2011.

In 2012 he established the production company Joio.  The company's first production was the film "Tir" for S4C.  The film was adapted from Roger Williams's original theatre play "Tir Sir Gâr" for which he won the Best Welsh language Playwright award at the Wales Theatre Critics Awards 2014.

References

Alumni of the University of Warwick
Welsh writers
Living people
1974 births
Welsh dramatists and playwrights